Jung Chan-woo (born January 26, 1998), better known mononymously as Chanwoo and also known by his stage name Chan, is a South Korean singer, actor and member of South Korean boy group iKon under 143 Entertainment. He is known for playing the younger counterparts of Lee Minho in both Boys Over Flowers (2009) and The Heirs (2013).

Biography

Early life
Jung Chan-woo was born on January 26, 1998, in Songpa-gu, Seoul, and raised in Yongin, Gyeonggi Province, South Korea. In 2006, he appeared in the music video for TVXQ's "Balloons", as the younger Max Changmin. In 2008, he appeared in Lost and Found and several subsequent drama series, beginning with The Great King Sejong. Jung played the younger version of Lee Min-ho's characters in both Boys Over Flowers and The Heirs.

2014–present: Mix & Match and iKon 

In late 2014, it was revealed that the YGE trainees from WIN: Who Is Next's Team B would return in another Mnet reality survival program Mix & Match. In addition, three new trainees were added to the competition, including Jung. The show resulted in the debut of all Team B members alongside Jung as a seven-member lineup under the name iKon. The group made their official debut on September 15, 2015, with the pre-release digital single "My Type".

In July 2018, Jung started his YouTube channel, named "Chan's Life (찬우살이)".

On September 30, 2021, it was announced that Jung will be continuing his acting career as one of the leads in a rom-com film/drama, titled My Chilling Roommate. Kim So-jeong of former girl group GFriend would be his costar.

Philanthropy
On April 8, 2019, it was reported Chan-woo donated ₩10 million to the Hope Bridge Association of the National Disaster Relief for the affected residents of the Gangwon wildfire in South Korea.

Discography

Filmography

Film

Television series

Television shows

Music video appearances

References

External links 

Living people
YG Entertainment artists
South Korean male singers
South Korean male film actors
South Korean male television actors
South Korean male idols
South Korean male child actors
South Korean pop singers
1998 births
IKon members
21st-century South Korean singers